The 2016 Northeast Conference women's soccer tournament is the postseason women's soccer tournament for the Northeast Conference to be held from November 4 to 6, 2016. The three match tournament will be held at the Stokes Soccerplex in Loretto, Pennsylvania. The four team single-elimination tournament will consist of two rounds based on seeding from regular season conference play. The Fairleigh Dickinson Knights are the defending tournament champions after defeating the Robert Morris Colonials in the championship match.

Bracket

Schedule

Semifinals

Final

See also 
 Northeast Conference
 2016 Northeast Conference women's soccer season
 2016 NCAA Division I women's soccer season
 2016 NCAA Division I Women's Soccer Tournament

References

External links 
2016 Northeast Conference Women's Soccer Tournament

Northeast Conference Women's Soccer Tournament
2016 Northeast Conference women's soccer season